Taiwanina is a genus of crane fly in the family Limoniidae.

Distribution
Philippines & Taiwan

Species
T. mindanica Alexander, 1932
T. pandoxa Alexander, 1928

References

Limoniidae
Nematocera genera
Diptera of Asia